Scott Jackson (born January 19, 1979) is a former American football offensive lineman for the Houston Texans of the National Football League (NFL). He was originally signed by the Tampa Bay Buccaneers as an undrafted free agent in 2004 and ended his five-year NFL career on the Houston Texans. He played college football at Brigham Young University.

High school

Jackson was a star offensive lineman for Palos Verdes Peninsula High School in Rolling Hills Estates, California. A three-year letterwinner, Jackson was named all-west, all-state and Los Angeles Times Lineman of the Year as a senior. He graduated from Peninsula High School in 1997. He was heavily recruited by Stanford, USC, Cal, UCLA, Washington, and Colorado State ultimately choosing to accept a full scholarship to BYU.

College career

Jackson reshirted his freshman year at Brigham Young University in 1997. After returning from a two-year mission for the Church of Jesus Christ of Latter-day Saints, Jackson started at center position. A broken fibula caused him to miss most of the 2000 season, and a knee injury cut his 2001 season short. During his junior year (2002), Jackson  earning All-Mountain West Conference honors his senior season. At the 2004 NFL Scouting Combine, Jackson ran the 40-yard dash in 4.94 seconds, the fastest of any offensive lineman at the Combine.

Professional career

Tampa Bay Buccaneers

Undrafted in the 2004 NFL Draft, Jackson was signed by the Tampa Bay Buccaneers as a free agent. Jackson failed to make the active roster out of training camp, but was signed to the team's practice squad, where he remained the rest of the season.

In 2005, Jackson again was signed to the practice squad following training camp, then was promoted to the active roster after the fourth game. A backup to the guard and center positions, Jackson did not appear in a game.

In the 2006 preseason, Jackson showed impressive improvement over his earlier preseason form and earned public praise from Buccaneers head coach John Gruden, however, Jackson was again cut by Tampa Bay and signed to its practice squad. Prior to the first game, however, injuries to other offensive linemen forced Jackson to again be promoted to the active roster, with the Buccaneers cutting former standout wide receiver David Boston to make room for him. Jackson saw no action, and was cut within days to make room for a long snapper, again being re-signed to the practice squad.

Houston Texans

A month later, Jackson was signed from Tampa Bay's practice squad by the Houston Texans. Jackson finished the 2006 season on the Texans' active roster, but did not see action in a regular season game. A season-ending shoulder injury during the 2007 training camp sidelined him on the Texans' injured reserve. After a foot injury during the 2008 preseason, Jackson underwent surgery and retired from the NFL in 2009.

Personal life

Jackson served as a missionary for the Church of Jesus Christ of Latter-day Saints to the Spanish-speaking residents in the Dallas area in 1998 and 1999. He is an Eagle Scout. Scott married Ashley McKinnon of Winter Park, Florida in 2002. Together they have four boys.

Education

During his time in the NFL, Jackson participated in several NFL Business Management and Entrepreneurial programs: Northwestern in 2005, Stanford in 2007 and Harvard in 2008. After retiring from the NFL, Jackson entered the Class of 2012 at the Darden Graduate School of Business Administration at the University of Virginia. Following graduation, Jackson accepted a position with Boston Consulting Group. He and his family currently live in Houston.

External links
BYU Football bio
Houston Texans bio
NFL Player bio
Tackling Autism Foundation
Sugar Land Family Tackles Autism
Texans Tackling Autism
All eyes will be on BYU's offensive line against Virginia

1979 births
Living people
Sportspeople from Whittier, California
Players of American football from California
American football centers
American football offensive guards
BYU Cougars football players
Tampa Bay Buccaneers players
Houston Texans players
University of Virginia Darden School of Business alumni